Fernando Sarasola (born 22 May 1966) is a Spanish equestrian. He competed at the 1996 Summer Olympics and the 2000 Summer Olympics.

References

External links
 

1966 births
Living people
Spanish male equestrians
Olympic equestrians of Spain
Equestrians at the 1996 Summer Olympics
Equestrians at the 2000 Summer Olympics
Place of birth missing (living people)